Peter McManus VC (March 1829 – 27 April 1859) was born in Tynan, County Armagh,  was an Irish recipient of the Victoria Cross, the highest and most prestigious award for gallantry in the face of the enemy that can be awarded to British and Commonwealth forces.

Details
McManus was approximately 28 years old, and a private in the 1st Battalion, 5th Regiment of Foot (later The Northumberland Fusiliers), British Army during the Indian Mutiny when the following deed took place on 26 September 1857 at Lucknow, India for which he and Private John Ryan was awarded the VC:

He later achieved the rank of sergeant.  He died from smallpox in Allahabad, British India, on 27 April 1859.

References

 The Register of the Victoria Cross (1981, 1988 and 1997)

 Ireland's VCs  (Dept of Economic Development, 1995)
 Monuments to Courage (David Harvey, 1999)
 Irish Winners of the Victoria Cross (Richard Doherty & David Truesdale, 2000)

Irish recipients of the Victoria Cross
Royal Northumberland Fusiliers soldiers
People from County Armagh
1829 births
1859 deaths
19th-century Irish people
Irish soldiers in the British Army
Indian Rebellion of 1857 recipients of the Victoria Cross
Deaths from smallpox
Infectious disease deaths in India
Military personnel from County Armagh
British Army recipients of the Victoria Cross